Saquayamycins are "aquayamycin-type" antibiotics isolated from Streptomyces nodosus.

References 

Antibiotics
Angucyclines